Madaj is a surname. Notable people with the surname include:

 Karol Madaj (born 1980), Polish board game designer
 Milan Madaj (born 1970), Slovak ski mountaineer
 Natalia Madaj (born 1988), Polish rower

See also
 Madaj, Maharashtra, a village in Maharashtra, India

West Slavic-language surnames